Horace Brooks Marshall, 1st Baron Marshall of Chipstead,  (5 August 1865 – 29 March 1936) was an English publisher and newspaper distributor and Lord Mayor of London, 1918–1919.

Early life
Marshall was born in Streatham, Surrey, a suburb of London. He was educated at Dulwich College and Trinity College, Dublin, and then joined his father's wholesale newspaper business in Fleet Street. Horace Brooks Marshall Sr (1830–1896) pioneered the sales of books and publications on the railways. As Horace Marshall and Son, it became one of the largest such businesses in the United Kingdom.

Civic career
After his father's death in 1896, Marshall succeeded him unopposed as member of the Court of Common Council of the City of London for Farringdon Without. He was Sheriff during the coronation year 1902, and was knighted in the 1902 Coronation Honours, receiving the accolade from King Edward VII at Buckingham Palace on 24 October that year. During his year as Sheriff, he also accompanied the Lord Mayor (Sir Joseph Dimsdale) on official visits to the English cities of Wolverhampton (July 1902), Bath and Exeter (September 1902).

He became alderman for Vintry Ward in 1909. He was Lord Mayor of London in 1918–1919. As Lord Mayor during the First World War victory celebrations, he was particularly prominent, being appointed to the Privy Council (entitling him to the style "The Right Honourable") in 1919 and appointed Knight Commander of the Royal Victorian Order (KCVO) in the 1920 New Year Honours. Marshall was raised to the peerage in the 1921 New Year Honours as Baron Marshall of Chipstead, of Chipstead in the County of Surrey, the first sitting alderman of the City of London to be so honoured.

Marshall received the honorary degree Doctor of Laws (LL.D.) from the University of Dublin in June 1902.

He was appointed Honorary Colonel of the 4th (City of London) Battalion, London Regiment, on 16 October 1918.

He was buried at St Margaret's, Chipstead. 
His only son died in infancy and the barony thus became extinct upon his death. He had two daughters; the elder, Nellie, married J. Arthur Rank.

Footnotes

References
Obituary, The Times, 30 March 1936

|-

1865 births
1936 deaths
People from Streatham
People educated at Dulwich College
Alumni of Trinity College Dublin
Publishers (people) from London
Sheriffs of the City of London
20th-century lord mayors of London
Barons in the Peerage of the United Kingdom
Knights Commander of the Royal Victorian Order
Knights Bachelor
Members of the Privy Council of the United Kingdom
Barons created by George V